George Casella (January 22, 1951 – June 17, 2012) was a Distinguished Professor in the Department of Statistics at the University of Florida. He died from multiple myeloma.

Academic career 
Casella completed his undergraduate education at Fordham University and graduate education at Purdue University. He served on the faculty of Rutgers University, Cornell University, and the University of Florida. His contributions focused on the area of statistics including Monte Carlo methods, model selection, and genomic analysis. He was particularly active in Bayesian and empirical Bayes methods, with works connecting with the Stein phenomenon, on assessing and accelerating the convergence of Markov chain Monte Carlo methods, as in his Rao-Blackwellisation technique, and recasting lasso as Bayesian posterior mode estimation with independent Laplace priors.

Awards 
Casella was named as a Fellow of the American Statistical Association and the Institute of Mathematical Statistics in 1988, and he was made an Elected Fellow of the International Statistical Institute in 1989. In 2009, he was made a Foreign Member of the Spanish Royal Academy of Sciences.

Selected bibliography

References

External links 
 
 

1951 births
2012 deaths
Deaths from multiple myeloma
American statisticians
Fellows of the American Statistical Association
University of Florida faculty
Fordham University alumni
Purdue University alumni
Fellows of the Institute of Mathematical Statistics
Elected Members of the International Statistical Institute
Cornell University faculty
The Bronx High School of Science alumni
Computational statisticians
Mathematical statisticians